Dmitry Albertovich Yablonsky (born 1962) is a Russian classical cellist and conductor, who was educated at the Juilliard School of Music and Yale University.

Early life and education
Dmitry Yablonsky was born in Moscow into a musical family, his mother is famed pianist Oxana Yablonskaya and his father is Albert Zayonts, who has been solo oboe of the Radio and Television orchestra in Moscow for 30 years.

Dmitry began playing the cello when he was 5 years old and was accepted into the Central Music School for gifted children. At the age of 9 he gave his orchestral debut playing Haydn´s cello concerto in C major.  In Russia, Dmitry studied with Stefan Kalianov, who has been Mstislav Rostropovich´s assistant and Isaak Buravsky, who for many years was solo cello of Bolshoi Theatre Orchestra. Before immigrating to the United States he performed on many occasions in Moscow and many cities of the former Soviet Union. Leaving the Soviet Union was not that easy in the 1970s, and the visa application was first refused and it took a few years and many signatures from many well known personalities such as Leonard Bernstein, and Katharine Hepburn to convince the Soviet authorities to issue a visa to allow his mother to leave the country.

Upon arrival in New York in 1977, he auditioned to the Juilliard School of Music and was accepted to study with Lorne Munroe principal cellist of the New York Philharmonic Orchestra.

In the summer of 1979, at the age 16, Dmitry was accepted to participate in Marlboro Music Festival in Vermont and was the youngest participant that summer. In Marlboro he met many great musicians as M. Horszowski, M.Tree, M. Shneider, M.Foley and many others. He played for David Soyer, cellist of Guarneri Quartet, who offered for Dmitry a place at the Curtis Institute of Music.

In the summer of 1980, Dmitry met Aldo Parisot, distinguished cellist and professor at Yale University where Dmitry spent 4 years. At Yale he became interested in conducting after meeting Otto Werner Muller, conducting professor.

Career
After graduating from Yale, he spent two years in the artist diploma program at the Juilliard School of Music with Zara Nelsova. During these years Dmitry played with János Starker, Mstislav Rostropovich, André Navarra, Maurice Gendron and many more.

During one festival, which took place in Camerino, Italy he was asked to replace a conductor, who cancelled at the last minute, in conducting the Stravinsky Octet with members of Orchestra dell'Accademia Nazionale di Santa Cecilia of Rome. This was quite challenging as he never conducted before. Dmitry was 26 years old and that was his conducting debut.

As a cellist he has played all over the world in venues as Carnegie Hall, La Scala, Moscow Great Hall, St. Petersburg Philharmonic Hall, Taiwan National Hall, Teatre Mogador, Cite de la Musique, Louvre and many others. Some chamber music partners have included,  Victor Tretyakov, Leif Ove Andsnes, Yuri Bashmet and many more.

For several years Dmitry has been Principal Guest Conductor of Moscow Philharmonic Orchestra and has conducted many orchestras all over the world including: Belgian National Orchestra, Catania Opera Orchestra, Netherlands North Orchestra, Holland symphonia, Bologna Chamber Orchestra, Taiwan National Orchestra, Russian State Orchestra, Orchestre National d´Ile de France, Israel Symphony Orchestra, Royal Philharmonic Orchestra.

He has collaborated with soloists as Montserrat Caballé, Roberto Alagna, Olga Borodina and performed Krzysztof Penderecki cello concerto with composer at the podium.

He has organized many festivals all over the world including Gabala Festival in Azerbaijan, Wandering Stars Festival, which takes place in different countries of the world each year. such as Israel, Italy, Russia, USA and more.

Dmitry Yablonsky is Co-Artistic Director of Gabala International Music Festival in Gabala, Azerbaijan. He is an academician of the Independent Academy of Aesthetics and Liberal Arts in Moscow, and also teaches cello at the Baku Academy of Music, since 2012 he is the Principal Guest Conductor of State Symphony Orchestra.

Dmitry has two cellos, which he uses for his cello concerts, a Joseph Filius Andrea Guarneri  and a Matteo Goffriller. He lives on the border of France and Spain in a beautiful Catalan Village in the mountains, Angoustrine-Villeneuve-des-Escaldes.

On March 1, 2015 he performed with the Jerusalem Symphony Orchestra in a program including music from baroque, classical, and romantic periods.

Yablonsky is also a conductor of the Ukrainian-based 'Kyiv Virtuosos' orchestra.

Dmitry Yablonsky is Online Master Teacher at iClassical Academy with whom he has recorded several online Masterclasses.

Recordings

The piano trio recording for Erato/Warner with Vadim Repin and Boris Berezovsky has won numerous awards. He has transcribed and edited works for cello, which was released by International Music Company and Dover Publications. His recording of all 40 Popper etudes for solo cello was released by Naxos records in the fall of 2008 to a great critical acclaim.

Dmitry has made more than 70 recordings as conductor and cellist for Naxos, Erato-Warner, Chandos, Belair Music, Sonora, Connoisseur Society.  Some of his recordings have won many prizes as, Berlin critic prize, Shostakovich's Jazz suites recording have been on charts in UK and US. Grammy nomination for 2007 and much more.

References

External links
Yablonsky's web site
Delitiae Musicae's biography on the Naxos web site
Yablonsky's biography on the AllMusic web site

1962 births
Living people
Russian classical cellists
21st-century Russian conductors (music)
Russian male conductors (music)
21st-century Russian male musicians
21st-century cellists